USA Hockey is the national ice hockey organization in the United States. It is recognized by the International Olympic Committee and the United States Olympic & Paralympic Committee as the governing body for organized ice hockey in the United States and is a member of the International Ice Hockey Federation. Before June 1991, the organization was known as the Amateur Hockey Association of the United States (AHAUS).

The organization is based in Colorado Springs, Colorado. Its mission is to promote the growth of ice hockey in the U.S. USA Hockey programs support and develop players, coaches, officials, and facilities. USA Hockey also has junior ice hockey and senior ice hockey programs, and supports a disabled ice hockey program. USA Hockey provides certification programs for coaches and officials. Members of the organization receive a subscription to USA Hockey Magazine.

History
The Amateur Hockey Association of the United States (AHAUS) was founded on October 29, 1937, in New York City by Tommy Lockhart. When he first started operating AHAUS, the paperwork fit into a shoebox in his apartment. The need for a national governing body for hockey came from the desire to efficiently manage the growing game of ice hockey, rather than having several different groups which included the Amateur Athletic Union.

In September 1938, Lockhart reached signed an agreement with W. G. Hardy of the Canadian Amateur Hockey Association (CAHA) which regulated international games in North America, set out provisions for transfer of players between the organizations, and recognized of each other's authority. In 1940, he led AHAUS into a union with the CAHA by establishing the International Ice Hockey Association, and served as its vice-president. AHAUS was admitted as a member of the Ligue Internationale de Hockey sur Glace in 1947, being recognized as the international governing body of hockey in the United States instead of the Amateur Athletic Union which was previously recognized by the IIHF.

Lockhart established the first national ice hockey tournaments for pre-high school boys in 1949. He announced the establishment of the United States Hockey Hall of Fame on May 19, 1968, to be located in the town of Eveleth, Minnesota. Lockhart was succeeded as president by William Thayer Tutt in 1972.

Executive personnel

Presidents
Tommy Lockhart (1937–1972)
William Thayer Tutt (1972–1986)
Walter Bush (1986–2003)
Ron DeGregorio (2003–2015)
Jim Smith (2015–2021)
Mike Trimboli (2021–present)

Executive directors
Hal Trumble (1972–1987)
Bob Johnson (1987–1990)
Baaron Pittenger (1990–1993)
Dave Ogrean (1993–1999)
Doug Palazzari (1999–2005)
Dave Ogrean (2005–2017)
Pat Kelleher (2017–present)

Director of hockey operations
Jim Johannson (2000–2018)
Coaching directors
Ken Johannson (1970–1978)
Lou Vairo (1978–1984)
Dave Peterson (c. 1980s–1997)
Chief medical officers
George Nagobads (1984 to 1992)
Michael Stuart (c. 2000s)

Hall of fame

Structure

Playing levels
Until 2016, USA Hockey used  division names such as Mite, Squirt, and Pewee in their youth levels and to indicate the age level of the players. Starting with the 2016–17 season, USA Hockey started using divisions labeled with the oldest age in the group.

Districts

USA Hockey has divided its control into geographical youth districts as follows:

Atlantic
Eastern Pennsylvania, New Jersey, Delaware
Central
Illinois, Wisconsin, Missouri, Iowa, Kansas, Nebraska
Massachusetts
Michigan
Mid-American
Ohio, Indiana, Western Pennsylvania, West Virginia, Kentucky
Minnesota
New England
Connecticut, Vermont, Rhode Island, Maine, New Hampshire
New York
Northern Plains
Montana, North Dakota, South Dakota, Wyoming
Pacific
California, Hawaii, Nevada, Alaska, Oregon, Washington
Rocky Mountain
Arizona, Colorado, Idaho, Texas, Oklahoma, Utah, New Mexico
Southeastern
Florida, Alabama, Arkansas, Georgia, Louisiana, Mississippi, Tennessee, North Carolina, South Carolina, Virginia, Maryland

National teams
Men's national team
Men's U20 national team
Men's U18 national team
Women's national team
Women's U18 national team
National inline hockey team
National sledge hockey team

National Team Development Program

USA Hockey also operates the National Team Development Program, based in Plymouth, Michigan. The program's goal is to prepare student-athletes under the age of 18 for participation on U.S. national teams and continued success throughout their future hockey careers. The NTDP consists of two teams; the U.S. National Under-18 Team, and the U.S. National Under-17 Team. The teams compete in the United States Hockey League in addition to playing NCAA colleges and in International competition. Until 2009, the NTDP competed in the North American Hockey League. Numerous NTDP alumni have gone on to play in the NHL. In the 2012–13 season, 60 former NTDP players suited up for NHL teams. In the 2006 NHL Entry Draft, six first-round selections (including no. 1 pick Erik Johnson) were former members of the NTDP. In 2007, four NTDP members were selected in the first round, with Patrick Kane and James van Riemsdyk going 1st and 2nd overall respectively. Through 2013, some 228 NTDP players had been selected in the NHL Entry Draft. The NTDP plays home games at USA Hockey Arena.

International participation by year
2017

2018

2019

2020

Chipotle-USA Hockey Nationals
USA Hockey has conducted the country’s ice hockey national championship tournaments since 1938, with teams from all across the United States crowned champions across various classifications.  The 2022 Chipotle-USA Hockey National Championships crowned champions at 25 different classifications, across nine different host sites across the country. Champions represented 17 different states. The High School Division, for example, had three champions. Shattuck-St. Mary's AAA team (MN) won the Division I title; Denver East (CO) won the Division II title; and Team Texas won the Girls title.

Minnesota high school AA and A hockey teams are not associated with USA Hockey and therefore are not eligible to compete in the USA Hockey Nationals. However, Minnesota's Junior Gold teams as well as AA and AAA teams are eligible for the tournament.

References

External links
USA Hockey website
U.S. Hockey Hall of Fame
United States Hockey Hall of Fame Museum
Patty Kazmaier Memorial Award
USA Hockey official publication

 
1937 establishments in the United States
 
International Ice Hockey Federation members
Organizations based in Ann Arbor, Michigan
Organizations based in Colorado Springs, Colorado
Ice hockey
Sports in Colorado Springs, Colorado
Sports organizations established in 1937